Cavetown Lough is a freshwater lake in the west of Ireland. It is located in County Roscommon in the catchment of the upper River Shannon.

Geography

Natural history
Fish species in Cavetown Lough include perch, roach, pike, bream and the critically endangered European eel. The lake was previously also a trout fishing destination.

See also
List of loughs in Ireland

References

Cavetown